This is a list of people associated with Nortel, a Canadian telecommunications manufacturer.

Directors
 Jalynn Bennett
 James Blanchard
 John Cleghorn – a former audit committee chairperson
 Frank Dunn
 Yves Fortier
 Ralph Holley Keefler
 John A MacNaughton
 Kristina M. Johnson
 John Manley
 Richard D. McCormick
 William Owens
 John Roth
 Guylaine Saucier
 Lynton Wilson
 Mike S. Zafirovski

Employees
 Bill Conner
 Michael Cowpland
 Whitfield Diffie
 Frank Dunn
 Mohamed Elmasry
 Lauren Flaherty
 Robert Gaskins
 Maureen Govern
 Vinita Gupta
 Ric Holt
 Ralph Holley Keefler
 Chris Lewis
 Walter Frederick Light
 Vernon Oswald Marquez
 Terry Matthews
 William Owens
 Kathleen Peterson
 James M. Phillips
 John Roth
 Edward Fleetford Sise
 Paul Fleetford Sise
 Simon Sunatori
 Mike S. Zafirovski
 Mousser JERBI
 Ramalingom Thavasinadar

References

Nortel
Nortel